CHARSHAHI is a village of Charshahi Union, Chandragonj Thana, Lakshmipur Sadar Upazila of Lakshmipur, Bangladesh.Wapda canal flows through the village.

References 

 http://charshahiup.lakshmipur.gov.bd/

Populated places in Lakshmipur District

Lakshmipur District